Tupadły may refer to the following places:
Tupadły, Gmina Inowrocław in Kuyavian-Pomeranian Voivodeship (north-central Poland)
Tupadły, Gmina Złotniki Kujawskie in Kuyavian-Pomeranian Voivodeship (north-central Poland)
Tupadły, Lipno County in Kuyavian-Pomeranian Voivodeship (north-central Poland)
Tupadły, Nakło County in Kuyavian-Pomeranian Voivodeship (north-central Poland)
Tupadły, Masovian Voivodeship (east-central Poland)
Tupadły, Pomeranian Voivodeship (north Poland)